Chrysogaster aerosa is a European species of hoverfly.

Distribution
Poland.

References

Diptera of Europe
Eristalinae
Insects described in 1854
Taxa named by Hermann Loew